The following is a list of known abandoned communities in Yukon, Canada.

 Canyon City
 Clinton Creek
 Elsa
 Fortymile
 Grand Forks
 Paris
 Silver City 
 Snag
 Yost

See also
List of communities in Yukon

Yukon